

Ludwig Merker (1 September 1894 – 14 March 1964) was a German general in the Wehrmacht during World War II. He was a recipient of the Knight's Cross of the Iron Cross of Nazi Germany.

Awards and decorations

 Knight's Cross of the Iron Cross on 18 November 1941 as Oberst and commander of 215th Infantry Regiment.

Further reading

References

Citations

Bibliography

 

1894 births
1964 deaths
People from the Kingdom of Württemberg
People from Künzelsau
German Army personnel of World War I
Recipients of the clasp to the Iron Cross, 1st class
Recipients of the Gold German Cross
Recipients of the Knight's Cross of the Iron Cross
Lieutenant generals of the German Army (Wehrmacht)
Reichswehr personnel
Military personnel of Württemberg
Military personnel from Baden-Württemberg
German Army generals of World War II